Cola glabra is a species of flowering plant in the family Malvaceae. It is found only in Nigeria. It is threatened by habitat loss.

References

glabra
Endemic flora of Nigeria
Vulnerable flora of Africa
Taxonomy articles created by Polbot
Taxa named by Ronald William John Keay